The Logan LDS Sixth Ward Church is a historic church in Logan, Utah of the Church of Jesus Christ of Latter-day Saints. It was built in 1907 by Olof I. Pedersen, and designed in the Gothic Revival style by architects K. C. Schaub and Joseph Monson. It has been listed on the National Register of Historic Places since July 17, 1979.

References

Churches completed in 1907
Churches on the National Register of Historic Places in Utah
Gothic Revival church buildings in Utah
National Register of Historic Places in Cache County, Utah
Meetinghouses of the Church of Jesus Christ of Latter-day Saints in Utah
1907 establishments in Utah